Anomophaenus is a genus of beetles in the family Carabidae, containing the following species: The genus was first described in 1882 by Charles Adolphe Albert Fauvel.

 Anomophaenus costatogranulatus (Chaudoir, 1879)
 Anomophaenus depressiusculus Heller, 1916
 Anomophaenus granellus (Fauvel, 1882)
 Anomophaenus granulipennis Fauvel, 1903
 Anomophaenus montanus Heller, 1916
 Anomophaenus montrousieri Bänninger, 1939
 Anomophaenus plicatifrons Heller, 1916
 Anomophaenus tenuistriatus Heller, 1916

References

Scaritinae
Taxa named by Charles Adolphe Albert Fauvel
Insects described in 1882